Gerald C. "Jerry" Knickerbocker (born October 20, 1943) was an American politician and businessman.

Knickerbocker was born in Cloquet, Carlton County, Minnesota and graduated from Cloquet High School. He received his bachelor's degree in business administration and economics from University of Minnesota. Knickerbocker lived in Hopkins, Minnesota with his wife and family and was involved in the real estate and insurance businesses. He served in the Minnesota House of Representatives from 1973 to 1994 and was a Republican.

References

1943 births
Living people
People from Cloquet, Minnesota
People from Hopkins, Minnesota
University of Minnesota alumni
Businesspeople from Minnesota
Republican Party members of the Minnesota House of Representatives